The following list of Minnesota companies includes notable companies that are, or once were, headquartered in Minnesota.

Companies based in Minnesota

0–9
 3M

A
 Abdallah Candies
 Allina Health
 AmeriPride Services
 Ameriprise Financial
 Andersen Corporation
 Arctic Cat
 ATS Medical
 Aveda
 Anytime Fitness

B
 Ballistic Recovery Systems
 Bemidji Airlines
 Bemidji Woolen Mills
 Best Buy

C
 C. H. Robinson
 Cambria
 Cargill
 Caribou Coffee
 Carlson Companies
 Canterbury Park Holding Company
 Ceridian
 Chase Bliss Audio
 CHS Inc.
 Cirrus Aircraft
 CodeWeavers
 Compass Airlines
 Cub Foods

D
 Dairy Queen
 Deluxe Corporation
 Department 56 
 Digi International 
 Digi-Key
 Digital River
 Donaldson Company
 Duluth Pack

E
 Ecolab
 Econofoods
 Edina Realty
 Endeavor Air
 Entrust Datacard

F
 Faribault Woolen Mill Company
 Famous Dave's
 Fantasy Flight Games
 Farley's & Sathers Candy Company
 Federated Mutual Insurance Company

G
 Geek Squad
 General Mills
 Glassbridge Enterprises
 Graco
 Great Clips

H
 Hazelden Foundation
 HealthEast Care System
 HealthPartners
 Hennepin County Medical Center
 Holiday Stationstores
 Hormel
 Horton Holding
 Hutchinson Technology

I
 IMRIS

J
 Jamf
 Jefferson Lines
 Jostens

L
 Land O'Lakes
 Lawson Software
 Life Time Fitness
 Lifetouch
 Lunds & Byerlys

M
 M Health Fairview
 MacSoft
 Maxfield Research
 Maurices
 Mayo Clinic
 Medtronic
 Minco Products
 Mosaic
 MTS Systems Corporation
 My Pillow

N
 Nordic Ware
 Northern States Power Company

O
 Old Dutch Foods

P
 PaR Systems
 Patterson Companies
 Pearson's Candy Company
 Piper Jaffray
 Polaris Industries
 Post Consumer Brands
 Perforce Software

Q
 Quality Bicycle Products

R
 Radisson Hotels
 Regions Hospital
 Regis Corporation
 Red Wing Shoes

S
 Schwan's Company
 Securian Financial Group
 Sleep Number
 Slumberland Furniture 
 Soo Line Railroad
 Summit Brewing Company
 Sun Country Airlines
 Supercuts
 Surly Bikes
 Surly Brewing Company

T
 Target Corporation
 Taylor Corporation
 Thrivent Financial
 Toro

U
 U.S. Bancorp
 Uni-Systems
 United Hardware Distributing Company
 UnitedHealth Group

W
 Watkins Incorporated
 Wilsons Leather
 Wings Financial Credit Union
 World Wide Pictures

X
 Xcel Energy

Companies formerly based in Minnesota

A
 Acorn Stores
 ADC Telecommunications
 Alliant Techsystems

B
 Buffets, Inc.

C
 Champion Air
 Control Data Corporation
 Christopher & Banks

F
 Fair Isaac Corporation

G
 Grand Casinos
 Green Giant
 Greyhound Lines
 Griswold Signal Company

J
 Johnson Boat Works

L
Lawson Software

M
 MAIR Holdings
 Mesaba Airlines
 Minneapolis-Moline
 Minnesota North Stars
 MOM Brands
 MoneyGram
 Musicland

N
 Nash Finch Company
 Northland Organic Foods Corporation
 North Central Airlines
 Northwest Airlines
 Norwest Corporation

P
 Pentair
 PepsiAmericas
 Petters Group Worldwide
 Pillsbury Company

R
 Republic Airlines

S
 St. Jude Medical
 SuperAmerica
 SuperValu

T
The Travelers Companies

U
 Unicel

V
 Valspar

References

 
Minnesota